This is a list of lighthouses in São Tomé and Príncipe.

Lighthouses

See also
 Lists of lighthouses and lightvessels

References

External links

São Tomé and Príncipe
Lighthouses
Lighthouses